Nicolae Iorgu (born 25 June 1944) is a Romanian fencer. He competed at the 1972 and 1976 Summer Olympics.

References

External links
 

1944 births
Living people
Romanian male fencers
Romanian épée fencers
Olympic fencers of Romania
Fencers at the 1972 Summer Olympics
Fencers at the 1976 Summer Olympics
People from Ialomița County
20th-century Romanian people
21st-century Romanian people